The Cayman Islands Dollar (currency code KYD) is the currency of the Cayman Islands.  It is abbreviated with the dollar sign $, or alternatively CI$ to distinguish it from other dollar-denominated currencies. It is subdivided into 100 cents.

History
The Cayman Islands dollar was introduced in 1972 (10 years after separation from the Colony of Jamaica), replacing the Jamaican dollar at par. Jamaican currency and Cayman Islands dollars both remained legal tender until 1 August 1972, when Jamaican currency ceased to be legal tender. The Cayman Islands dollar has been pegged to the United States dollar at 1 Cayman Islands dollar = 1.2 U.S. dollars since 1 April 1974, when the Currency Law of 1974 was enacted. In 1983, the 1974 law was repealed and replaced by the Currency Law Revised, which itself was replaced in 1997 by section 22 of the Monetary Authority Law. Under section 22 of the 2013 revision of the Monetary Authority Law, the value of the Cayman dollar in United States Dollars is determined by the Governor.

Coins
In 1972, coins in denominations of 1¢, 5¢, 10¢ and 25¢ were introduced. The 1¢ was struck in bronze, with the other denominations in cupronickel. From 1992, copper and nickel-plated steel replaced bronze and cupronickel, respectively.

Banknotes
On 1 May 1972, the Cayman Islands Currency Board introduced notes in denominations of 1, 5, 10 and 25 dollars. 40 dollar notes were introduced in 1981 but were taken out of circulation a few years later, followed by 100 dollars in 1982 and 50 dollars in 1987. On 1 January 1997, the Cayman Islands Monetary Authority (CIMA) took over issuance of paper money, issuing notes for 1, 5, 10, 25, 50 and 100 dollars. The current series of notes was issued on 4 April 2011.

Exchange rates

On the islands, the US dollar is accepted as legal currency by hotels, restaurants, and retail establishments at the rate of 1 US Dollar for every 80 Cayman cents. Change is usually given in Cayman Island dollars.

Banks buy US Dollars at 82 Cayman Island cents each and sell 1.20 US dollars per Cayman Island dollar. , the Cayman Islands Monetary Authority uses a retail exchange rate of CI$1.00 = US$1.227.

Half pounds

The Cayman Islands dollar is an offshoot of the Jamaican dollar, which is essentially a half pound sterling.  Jamaica followed the pattern of South Africa, Australia, and New Zealand in using the half-pound unit as opposed to the pound as the unit of account when it adopted the decimal system.  The choice of the name "dollar" was motivated by the fact that the reduced value of the new unit corresponded more closely to the value of the US dollar than it did to the pound sterling.

See also
Cayman Islands Monetary Authority
Central banks and currencies of the Caribbean
Economy of the Cayman Islands

References

External links
Cayman Islands Monetary Authority

Circulating currencies
Currencies of the Commonwealth of Nations
Dollar
Economy of the Cayman Islands
Fixed exchange rate
Currencies of British Overseas Territories
Currencies introduced in 1972
Currencies of the Caribbean